Danbury Hospital is a 456-bed hospital in Danbury, Connecticut serving patients in Fairfield County, Connecticut, as well as Westchester County and Putnam County, New York.

The hospital has 3,300 employees and is part of the Nuvance Health system. John M. Murphy, M.D. is CEO of Nuvance Health, and previously served as president and CEO of Western Connecticut Health Network, which merged with Health Quest in early 2019 to form Nuvance Health.

Notable departments and offerings
The Praxair Heart and Vascular center provides open heart surgery and coronary angioplasty to all the patients in need of care. Founded in 2003 the Center leads the state in outcomes for cardiac surgery and heart and vascular treatment. Specialized care for valve disease, heart failure, electrical disease of the heart, percutaneous arterial treatment, in state-of-the-art new facilities. The provider for advanced tertiary care for over 500,000 people in Eastern New York and Western Connecticut.
The Center for Weight Loss Surgery was started in the fall of 2002.
The Praxair Cancer Center at Danbury Hospital is the Western Connecticut Affiliate of the Yale Cancer Center. Services range from prevention to aftercare. The Praxair Foundation, run by a company with offices in Danbury, contributed $4 million to the hospital (the largest donation the hospital ever received) to support cardiovascular care. The new center was dedicated in May 2006.
Walgreens Pharmacy is a retail pharmacy on the first floor of the  Stock Building and is open seven days a week.
Sleep Disorders Center
Hobbit Health Sciences Library A staffed health sciences library, with access to a collection of more than 300 books, 1300 eBooks, 3000 journals, and databases such as Access Emergency Medicine, Access Surgery, Clinical Key, DynaMed, RefWorks, and Micromedex. They also maintain a collection of board review materials for Internal Medicine, Surgery, Cardiology, and Primary Care, as well as providing open access journals that number in excess of 14,000.
Complementary Alternative Medicine includes "programs designed specifically to complement and enhance traditional medicine, rather than replace it," according to the hospital's Web site. "On-site holistic services include therapeutic touch, reiki, and instruction on relaxation techniques. Staff also provides referrals for massage therapy, acupuncture, chiropractic treatment, hypnosis, biofeedback, nutritional experts, homeopathic practitioners, and naturopathic physicians. Patients may purchase magnets, herbs, and vitamins through the program."

Awards
 HealthGrades ranks Danbury Hospital in the top 5% across the United States for overall clinical performance - five years in a row: 2005, 2006, 2007, 2008 and 2009
 The only accredited chest pain center in Fairfield County, a level II trauma center and accredited stroke center.
 Health grades ranks Danbury Hospital in the top 5% in the United States for overall Cardiac Services - Two years in a row: 2008 and 2009
 Health grades ranks Danbury Hospital in the top 5 hospitals in Connecticut for the treatment of Stroke - Seven years in a row: 2003, 2004, 2005, 2006, 2007, 2008 and 2009
 Health grades ranks Danbury Hospital in the top 5 hospitals in Connecticut for Joint replacement - Two years in a row: 2008 and 2009
 Health grades ranks Danbury Hospital in the top 5% in the United States for Gastrointestinal Surgery in 2009
 Health grades ranks Danbury Hospital in the top 5% in the United States for overall Gastrointestinal Services - Two years in a row: 2008 and 2009
Solucient LLC, a national firm providing statistical analysis of health care quality, named Danbury Hospital on its list of "100 Top Hospitals" for 2004, 2005 and 2006. (and one of only two across the country) to get "1A accreditation status" from the American College of Surgeons - the highest level of hospital achievement - for its quality, safety and reporting standards for weight-loss surgery.
The American Society for Bariatric Surgery (ASBS) named Danbury Hospital as a bariatric surgery center of excellence in 2005.
The hospital received "Accreditation with Commendation" from the Joint Commission on Accreditation of Healthcare Organizations.
The hospital received "2009 CoC Outstanding Achievement Award" from the American College of Surgeons

Satellite locations
Brookfield Family Medicine and the Brookfield Specimen Collection Facility, in the Greenknoll Professional Building, 60 Old New Milford Road
Danbury Diagnostic Imaging Center opened in Danbury in 2001.
Danbury: Seifert & Ford Family Community Health Center, 70 Main St. in downtown Danbury
Danbury Specimen Collection Facility, 41 Germantown Road
New Canaan Immediate Care, 38 East Avenue
Ridgefield Diagnostic Imaging (RDI), and the Ridgefield Surgical Center LLC, 901 Ethan Allen Highway-Route 7. RDI offers a "full range of diagnostic services" for radiologic care, according to a hospital news release. The surgical center is a joint venture between Danbury Health Systems and local surgeons and offers outpatient surgery. Both units opened in the summer of 2006 at the same address.
Ridgefield Specimen Collection Facility, 10 South St.
Southbury: The Danbury Hospital Health Center, in the Southbury Medical Building at 22 Old Waterbury Road, offers three primary care practices: Primary Care of Southbury, Southbury Pediatrics and Southbury Geriatrics) along with specialist practices (Health Specialists of Southbury, Physical Medicine Center of Southbury, Patient Laboratory Services and Home and Hospice Care).

Affiliations
Danbury Hospital is affiliated with University of Vermont School of Medicine, University of Medicine and Health Sciences, Ross University School of Medicine, New York Medical College. The hospital also affiliated with New York Medical College in 1974 to support pediatrics, psychiatry and surgery, the University of Connecticut's School of Medicine to support nuclear medicine.

Danbury Hospital is a member of the Council of Teaching Hospital and Health Systems (COTH) of the Association of American Medical Colleges (AAMC). Of the 1,100 hospitals involved in graduate medical education in this country, the 400 COTH member institutions train about three-quarters of the residents in the United States.

History

Founded in 1885, Danbury Hospital was a small community hospital for its first 50 years. Its School of Nursing was established in 1893, and the first graduate medical education (GME) program was a one-year general internship approved in 1926.

In 1970 the hospital developed a long-range strategic plan which included a proposal to make the hospital a regional teaching hospital. A full-time faculty was formed and eventually evolved into the multi-specialty, not-for-profit practice called Danbury Office of Physician Services, PC.

A three-story addition (Stroock Tower) and a two level parking garage opened in January 1985.

On June 20, 2014, a new 11 story, 316,000 sf addition to the hospital (The Peter and Carmen Lucia Buck Pavilion) was opened.

Other area hospitals
 New Milford Hospital
 Griffin Hospital in Derby, Connecticut
 Norwalk Hospital
 Stamford Hospital
 Bridgeport Hospital

References

External links
 Danbury Hospital Web site
 Connecticut Department of Public Health
 Hospital Performance Comparisons a report released in February 2006 by the state Department of Health
 Careers at Danbury Hospital

Hospital buildings completed in 1885
Teaching hospitals in Connecticut
Buildings and structures in Danbury, Connecticut
Trauma centers